Beni Airport  is an airport serving the city of Beni in Nord-Kivu Province, Democratic Republic of the Congo.

The Wageni Airport, which is within the city of Beni, is also sometimes called Beni Airport.

Airlines and destinations

See also

 Transport in the Democratic Republic of the Congo
 List of airports in the Democratic Republic of the Congo

References

External links
 Google Maps - Beni Mavivi
 FallingRain - Beni Mavivi
 HERE Maps - Beni Mavivi Airport
 OpenStreetMap - Beni Mavivi
 OurAirports - Beni Mavivi
 

Airports in North Kivu